aka Oniroku Dan's OL Rope Slave and sometimes mis-referenced as  is a 1981 Japanese film in Nikkatsu's Roman porno series, directed by Katsuhiko Fujii and starring Junko Mabuki.

Synopsis
Two assistants to an S&M photographer decide to practise their master's art on their own. They convince a young woman to pose for them and subject her to bondage and torture during the photography session. After their work is finished, the three go to the home of the young woman's ex-boyfriend and attack him and his wife.

Cast
 Junko Mabuki - Kimiyo Ezaki
 Asami Ogawa - Kikuko Okazaki
 Miki Yamaji - Yumiko Mizuhara
 Yōko Azusa - Keiko Fujikawa
 Masayoshi Nogami - Kaoru Mitamura
 Koshirō Asami - Taketsugu Sawada
 Hiroshi Shimakazu - Mikio Misaki
 Yūdai Ishiyama - Teruo Okazaki
 Tatsuya Hamaguchi - Bank manager
 Kensuke Tamai - Cleaning Shop Owner
 Setsuko Yamaguchi - Shizue
 Hiroko Uchida - Takako
 Chiharu Migiya - Office lady

Background
The film marked one of the most significant performances of Junko Mabuki as Nikkatsu's second . Actor Masayoshi Nogami made a career playing brutal rapists, ranging from Seduction of the Flesh (1968) to Office Lady Rope Slave. He surprised the pink film audience in 1983 by venturing into gay-themed pink films with Legend of the Big Penis: Beautiful Mystery and Mansion of Roses: Passion of Men.

Critical appraisal
In their Japanese Cinema Encyclopedia: The Sex Films, the Weissers give Office Lady Rope Slave a negative review, giving it one and a half points out of four. They judge that Oniroku Dan's script shows none of the style that has made his work popular. They also fault director Fujii as being barely competent. "This is truly shabby entertainment," they conclude, "There's probably a redeeming maxim stuck somewhere in this mess, but the whole thing is too tasteless and too misogynist for anyone to care."

Availability
Office Lady Rope Slave was released theatrically in Japan on January 23, 1981. It was released to home video in VHS format on December 22, 1989. It was released on DVD in Japan on December 21, 2007, as part of Geneon's tenth wave of Nikkatsu Roman porno series.

Bibliography

English

Japanese

Notes

1981 films
1980s Japanese-language films
Nikkatsu films
Pink films
1980s Japanese films